is a Japanese biochemist, best known for research on apoptosis, the process of programmed cell death occurring in multi-cellular organisms.

Contribution 
Nagata identified Interferon in 1980 and Granulocyte colony-stimulating factor in 1986. He also identified a death factor (Fas receptor) in 1991 and its ligand (Fas ligand) in 1993, and elucidated their physiological and pathological roles in apoptosis.

Biography 
Nagata was born in Kanazawa, Japan, and completed his PhD under the supervision of Yoshito Kaziro at the University of Tokyo in 1977.

Nagata served as a postdoctoral fellow under Charles Weissmann at University of Zurich, where he worked on sequencing the cDNA of Interferon gene between 1977 and 1981. He was assistant professor at the Institute of Medical Science, the University of Tokyo between 1982 and 1987, and Head of Department of molecular biology at Osaka Bioscience Institute between 1987 and 1998, where Osamu Hayaishi served as president at that time.

Nagata became Professor of genetics at Osaka University Medical School between 1995 and 2007, before being appointed as Professor of medical chemistry at the Graduate School of Medicine, Kyoto University in 2007.

After retiring from Kyoto University and becoming Professor Emeritus in 2015, Nagata has been Professor of biochemistry and immunology at the Immunology Frontier Research Center, Osaka University.

Honors and awards 
 1994: Emil von Boehring Prize, Marburg University
 1995: Robert Koch Prize
 1996: Prix Lacassagne, French Cancer League
 1998: Asahi Prize
 2000: Imperial Prize of the Japan Academy
 2001: Person of Cultural Merit
 2004: Cell Death Society Prize, International Cell Death Society
 2010: Member of the Japan Academy
 2012: Honorary Doctorate, University of Zurich
 2012: Tomizo Yoshida Award, Japanese Cancer Association and Tomizo Yoshida Memorial Hall
 2012: Debrecen Award for Molecular Medicine
 2013: Keio Medical Science Prize
 2015: Foreign Associate of the United States National Academy of Sciences

External links 
 Shigekazu Nagata, Member of the Japan Academy
 Shigekazu Nagata, Foreign Associate of the National Academy of Science

References 

1949 births
Living people
Cell biologists
Japanese biochemists
Japanese immunologists
Japanese molecular biologists
Laureates of the Imperial Prize
Foreign associates of the National Academy of Sciences
Academic staff of Kyoto University
University of Tokyo alumni
People from Kanazawa, Ishikawa